Maurice Edward Cheeks (born September 8, 1956) is an American professional basketball coach and former player who serves as assistant coach for the Chicago Bulls of the National Basketball Association (NBA). He has also served as head coach of the Portland Trail Blazers, Philadelphia 76ers and Detroit Pistons. Cheeks was inducted into the Naismith Memorial Basketball Hall of Fame as a player in 2018.

Early life
Cheeks was born in Chicago, and attended DuSable High School. He attended West Texas State University from 1974 to 1978. Cheeks was an all-Missouri Valley Conference player for three straight seasons, as he averaged 16.8 points per game and shot nearly 57% for his collegiate career. He is the third leading scorer in WTSU/WTAM history.

Playing career
After college, Cheeks was selected as the 36th pick in the second round of the 1978 NBA draft by the Philadelphia 76ers. He played 15 years as a point guard in the NBA, including 11 with the Philadelphia 76ers, He earned four trips to the NBA All-Star Game, and he helped the 76ers to three trips to the NBA Finals in a four-year span in the early 1980s (1980, 1982, and 1983), including an NBA championship in 1983.  While starting at point guard for a Sixers team that at times included stars Julius Erving, Moses Malone, Andrew Toney, and Charles Barkley, Cheeks was well regarded for his team play and defensive skills. He was named to four straight NBA All-Defensive squads from 1983 to 1986, and earned a spot on the second team in 1987.

Philadelphia 76ers (1978–1989)
Cheeks was selected with the 36th pick in the second round of the 1978 NBA draft by the Philadelphia 76ers. He had his best seasons with the 76ers. At the young age of 22 he gained a notable role on the 76ers, solidifying himself as the starting point guard and earning himself valuable minutes. The 76ers were also in playoff contention for every year that he was on the team except for the 1987–88 season. By his fifth year in the league, he was selected to his first All-Star appearance and had averaged 12.5 points, 6.9 assists, and 2.3 steals for the 1982–83 season. The 76ers also had the best season in this era, having a 65–17 record which is the second-best season record in the 76ers franchise history. They would go on to win the NBA championship that year, which was Cheeks' first and only championship. He would be an integral part of the 76ers for the rest of his time in Philadelphia, however the 76ers failed to repeat the level of success that they reached in the 1982–83 season. He would be selected to three more All-Star appearances from 1986 to 1988. In the 1986 playoffs he averaged a playoff career high 20.8 points throughout the whole postseason. In the 1986–87 season he would average a career high 15.6 points in what was considered the best season of his career. However the 76ers were no longer elite title contenders and lost in the first round in the 1987 playoffs. The following year they missed the playoffs in what was Cheeks' last all star appearance. Cheeks played one more season for the 76ers; they were back in the playoffs but got swept in the first round by the New York Knicks.

San Antonio Spurs (1989–1990)
In the 1989 off-season the Philadelphia 76ers traded Maurice Cheeks, Chris Welp, and David Wingate to the San Antonio Spurs for Johnny Dawkins and Jay Vincent. At 33 years old, Cheeks was aging and in the twilight of his career but he still played well for the Spurs and averaged 10.9 points for his time in San Antonio. He played 50 games for the club and was the starting point guard. However he wasn't able to finish the 1989–90 season for the Spurs.

New York Knicks (1990–1991)
On February 21, 1990 Cheeks was traded to the New York Knicks for Rod Strickland. Cheeks played the remainder of the season in New York, averaging 7.9 points in 31 games for the franchise. The Knicks went 45–37 that year and made the 1990 playoffs, however they lost in the second round 1–4 to the Detroit Pistons. The following year the Knicks made the playoffs and were swept by the Bulls in the first round.

Atlanta Hawks (1991–1992)
In the 1991 off-season the New York Knicks traded Maurice Cheeks to the Atlanta Hawks for Tim McCormick and a 1994 first round draft pick (which later became Charlie Ward). Cheeks' points average dropped drastically to 4.6 and he was no longer a starting calibre player. He became an unrestricted free agent in the 1992 off-season and did not re-sign with the Hawks.

In the second-to-last game of the 1991–92 season, while playing for the Atlanta Hawks against the visiting New York Knicks, Cheeks picked off four steals to surpass longtime Philadelphia teammate Julius Erving for the ABA and NBA steals record of 2,272.  In the same game, teammate Kevin Willis set the Atlanta Hawks season record for rebounds.

New Jersey Nets (1992–1993)
On January 7, 1993 the New Jersey Nets signed Cheeks as a free agent. He averaged a career-low 3.6 points for the season and he only played 35 games for the franchise. The Nets reached the playoffs but lost in the first round 2–3 to the Cleveland Cavaliers.

Retirement
After the season ended Cheeks became a free agent but never played in the NBA again. At 36 years old he retired from the NBA.

Maurice Cheeks was inducted into the 2018 Naismith Memorial Basketball Hall of Fame

In NBA history, Cheeks ranks sixth in steals and eleventh in assists. Upon his retirement from the NBA in 1993, he was the NBA all-time leader in steals and fifth in assists. He averaged 11.7 points and over 2 steals per game for his career. In his rookie year, Cheeks averaged 4.1 steals per game in the 1979 NBA Playoffs, an NBA record for one playoff run.

Coaching career
After retirement, Cheeks spent one year coaching for the Continental Basketball Association’s Quad City Thunder, before becoming the 76ers assistant head coach in 1994. He coached under head coaches John Lucas (1994–96), Johnny Davis (1996–97), and Larry Brown, and he was an instrumental part of the Philadelphia team that reached the 2001 NBA Finals. In 2001, he was hired as Portland Trail Blazers head coach.  He led the team to two playoff berths in four years as coach, but could not get past the first round. He was fired after a poor start to the 2004–05 campaign.

On April 25, 2003, during a game between the Trail Blazers and the Dallas Mavericks, Cheeks aided 13-year-old Natalie Gilbert in singing the American national anthem. After Gilbert forgot the words at "At the twilight's last gleaming", Cheeks rushed over to help her and they finished it together, as the entire Rose Garden Arena crowd sang with them. Cheeks and Gilbert received a standing ovation after the song was over.

In 2005, Cheeks was named as head coach of the 76ers. Cheeks was popular among Sixers fans because of his eleven-year tenure with the Sixers, during which he helped guide the Sixers to the 1983 NBA championship. The move was also praised by Sixers star Allen Iverson, who worked with Cheeks during his run as Sixers' Assistant Head Coach.

However, he missed the playoffs in each of his first two seasons. Frustrations began to grow with Sixers veterans Allen Iverson and Chris Webber, who were not happy with the team's direction. During the 2006–07 season, Iverson would be traded to the Nuggets and Webber would be released, leaving Cheeks with one of the youngest teams in the NBA. On February 20, 2007, the 76ers extended Cheeks' contract one year despite his losing record as coach.

At the beginning of the 2007–08 season, expectations were low and the 76ers were picked to finish last in the Conference by many prognosticators. However, the Sixers clinched a playoff berth with a win over the Atlanta Hawks on April 4, 2008. It was their first postseason appearance since 2005, as well as the first in the post-Iverson era. However, they were eliminated by the Detroit Pistons, 4–2. Even with this elimination, many fans considered this to be a successful season, considering that the Sixers were 12 games under .500 in early February and went on to have a 21–7 run that led them to the playoffs.

The Sixers started out the 2008–09 NBA season 9–14, despite their signing of Elton Brand and re-signing of Andre Iguodala during the off-season. Due to their slow start, the 76ers fired Cheeks on December 13, 2008.

On August 14, 2009, he was hired as an assistant coach for the Oklahoma City Thunder.

On June 10, 2013, Cheeks agreed to become the head coach of the Detroit Pistons. On February 9, 2014, the Detroit Pistons relieved him of his head coaching duties and replaced him with John Loyer on an interim basis for the remainder of the season. The move came after owner Tom Gores suggested that the Pistons were "better than our record" and weren't playing "at their maximum"–a veiled criticism of Cheeks.

On June 29, 2015, Cheeks returned to the Thunder as an assistant coach.

On November 14, 2020, Cheeks was hired by the Chicago Bulls as an assistant coach following the team's hiring of Billy Donovan.
 
He was also a great coach and mentor to those in need. https://www.reddit.com/r/HumansBeingBros/comments/11ozbj6/1_man_sings_with_teen_who_froze_during_the_anthem/?utm_source=share&utm_medium=ios_app&utm_name=iossmf

Honors and awards
On September 7, 2018, Cheeks was inducted into the Naismith Memorial Basketball Hall of Fame as a player.

NBA career statistics

Regular season

|-
| style="text-align:left;"| 
| style="text-align:left;"| Philadelphia
| 82 || – || 29.4 || .510 || – || .721 || 3.1 || 5.3 || 2.1 || .1 || 8.4
|-
| style="text-align:left;"| 
| style="text-align:left;"| Philadelphia
| 79 || – || 33.2 || .540 || .444 || .779 || 3.5 || 7.0 || 2.3 || .4 || 11.4
|-
| style="text-align:left;"| 
| style="text-align:left;"| Philadelphia
| 81 || – || 29.8 || .534 || .375 || .787 || 3.0 || 6.9 || 2.4 || .5 || 9.4
|-
| style="text-align:left;"|
| style="text-align:left;"| Philadelphia
| 79 || 79 || 31.6 || .521 || .273 || .777 || 3.1 || 8.4 || 2.6 || .4 || 11.2
|-
| style="text-align:left;background:#afe6ba;"| †
| style="text-align:left;"| Philadelphia
| 79 || 79 || 31.2 || .542 || .167|| .754 || 2.6 || 6.9 || 2.3 || .4 || 12.5
|-
| style="text-align:left;| 
| style="text-align:left;"| Philadelphia
| 75 || 75 || 33.3 || .550 || .400 || .733 || 2.7 || 6.4 || 2.3 || .3 || 12.7
|-
| style="text-align:left;"| 
| style="text-align:left;"| Philadelphia
| 78 || 78 || 33.5 || .570 || .231 || .879 || 2.8 || 6.4 || 2.2 || .3 || 13.1
|-
| style="text-align:left;"|  
| style="text-align:left;"| Philadelphia
| 82 || 82 || 39.9 || .537 || .235 || .842 || 2.9 || 9.2 || 2.5 || .3 || 15.4
|-
| style="text-align:left;"|
| style="text-align:left;"| Philadelphia
| 68 || 68 || 38.6 || .527 || .235 || .777 || 3.2 || 7.9 || 2.6 || .2 || 15.6
|-
| style="text-align:left;"|
| style="text-align:left;"| Philadelphia
| 79 || 79 || 36.3 || .495 || .136 || .825 || 3.2 || 8.0 || 2.1 || .3 || 13.7
|-
| style="text-align:left;"|
| style="text-align:left;"| Philadelphia
| 71 || 70 || 32.4 || .483 || .077 || .774 || 2.6 || 7.8 || 1.5 || .2 || 11.6
|-
| style="text-align:left;"|
| style="text-align:left;"| San Antonio
| 50 || 49 || 35.3 || .478 || .111 || .832 || 3.3 || 6.0 || 1.6 || .1 || 10.9
|-
| style="text-align:left;"|
| style="text-align:left;"| New York
| 31 || 13 || 24.3 || .579 || .429 || .877 || 2.4 || 4.9 || 1.4 || .2 || 7.9
|-
| style="text-align:left;"|
| style="text-align:left;"| New York
| 76 || 64 || 28.3 || .499 || .250 || .814 || 2.3 || 5.7 || 1.7 || .1 || 7.8
|-
| style="text-align:left;"|
| style="text-align:left;"| Atlanta
| 56 || 0 || 19.4 || .462 || .500 || .605 || 1.7 || 3.3 || 1.5 || .0 || 4.6
|-
| style="text-align:left;"|
| style="text-align:left;"| New Jersey
| 35 || 0 || 14.6 || .548 || .000 || .889 || 1.2 || 3.1 || .9 || .1 || 3.6
|- class="sortbottom"
| style="text-align:center;" colspan=2| Career
| 1101 || 736 || 31.6 || .523 || .255 || .793 || 2.8 || 6.7 || 2.1 || .3 || 11.1
|- class="sortbottom"
| style="text-align:center;" colspan="2"| All-Star
| 4 || 1 || 11.0 || .438 ||  || 1.000 || .8 || 1.0 || .8 || .0 || 4.0

Playoffs

|-
|style="text-align:left;"|1979
|style="text-align:left;”|Philadelphia
|9||–||36.7||.545||–||.661||3.9||7.0||4.1||.4||18.8
|-
|style="text-align:left;"|1980
|style="text-align:left;”|Philadelphia
|18||–||37.5||.511||.200||.707||4.1||6.2||2.5||.2||11.6
|-
|style="text-align:left;"|1981
|style="text-align:left;”|Philadelphia
|16||–||32.1||.544||.000||.762||3.2||7.3||2.5||.8||10.5
|-
|style="text-align:left;"|1982
|style="text-align:left;”|Philadelphia
|21||–||36.4||.472||.111||.769||3.0||8.2||2.3||.3||14.3
|-
|style="text-align:left;background:#afe6ba;"|1983†
|style="text-align:left;”|Philadelphia
|13||–||37.2||.503||.500||.703||3.0||7.0||2.0||.2||16.3
|-
|style="text-align:left;"|1984
|style="text-align:left;”|Philadelphia
|5||–||34.2||.522||.000||.867||2.4||3.8||2.6||.0||16.6
|-
|style="text-align:left;"|1985
|style="text-align:left;”|Philadelphia
|13||13||37.2||.529||.000||.857||3.5||5.2||2.4||.4||15.2
|-
|style="text-align:left;"|1986
|style="text-align:left;”|Philadelphia
|12||12||43.3||.516||.000||.849||4.7||7.1||1.1||.3||20.8
|-
|style="text-align:left;"|1987
|style="text-align:left;”|Philadelphia
|5||5||42.0||.530||.000||.857||2.6||8.8||1.8||.8||17.6
|-
|style="text-align:left;"|1989
|style="text-align:left;”|Philadelphia
|3||3||42.7||.512||.000||.846||3.7||13.0||2.3||.3||17.7
|-
|style="text-align:left;"|1990
|style="text-align:left;”|New York
|10||10||38.8||.481||.000||.903||3.9||8.5||1.7||.2||12.8
|-
|style="text-align:left;"|1991
|style="text-align:left;”|New York
|3||3||33.7||.609||.333||.500||3.0||5.3||1.0||.3||10.0
|-
|style="text-align:left;"|1993
|style="text-align:left;”|New Jersey
|5||0||16.4||.478||–||.000||1.2||2.8||1.2||.2||4.4
|- class="sortbottom"
| style="text-align:center;" colspan="2"| Career
| 133 || 46 || 36.5 || .512 || .098 || .777 || 3.4 || 6.9 || 2.2 || .3 || 14.4

Head coaching record

|-
| style="text-align:left;"|Portland
| style="text-align:left;"|
|82||49||33|||| style="text-align:center;"|3rd in Pacific||3||0||3||.000
| style="text-align:center;"|Lost in First round
|-
| style="text-align:left;"|Portland
| style="text-align:left;"|
|82||50||32|||| style="text-align:center;"|3rd in Pacific||7||3||4||.429
| style="text-align:center;"|Lost in First round
|-
| style="text-align:left;"|Portland
| style="text-align:left;"|
|82||41||41|||| style="text-align:center;"|3rd in Pacific||—||—||—||—
| style="text-align:center;"|Missed Playoffs
|-
| style="text-align:left;"|Portland
| style="text-align:left;"|
|55||22||33|||| style="text-align:center;"|(fired)||—||—||—||—
| style="text-align:center;"|—
|-
| style="text-align:left;"|Philadelphia
| style="text-align:left;"|
|82||38||44|||| style="text-align:center;"|2nd in Atlantic||—||—||—||—
| style="text-align:center;"|Missed Playoffs
|-
| style="text-align:left;"|Philadelphia
| style="text-align:left;"|
|82||35||47|||| style="text-align:center;"|3rd in Atlantic||—||—||—||—
| style="text-align:center;"|Missed Playoffs
|-
| style="text-align:left;"|Philadelphia
| style="text-align:left;"|
|82||40||42|||| style="text-align:center;"|3rd in Atlantic||6||2||4||.333
| style="text-align:center;"|Lost in First round
|-
| style="text-align:left;"|Philadelphia
| style="text-align:left;"|
|23||9||14|||| style="text-align:center;"|(fired)||—||—||—||—
| style="text-align:center;"|—
|-
| style="text-align:left;"|Detroit
| style="text-align:left;"|
|50||21||29|||| style="text-align:center;"|(fired)||—||—||—||—
| style="text-align:center;"|—
|- class="sortbottom"
| style="text-align:left;"|Career
| ||620||305||315|||| ||16||5||11||||

See also
List of National Basketball Association career assists leaders
List of National Basketball Association career steals leaders
List of National Basketball Association career playoff assists leaders
List of National Basketball Association career playoff steals leaders
List of National Basketball Association players with most assists in a game
List of National Basketball Association players with most steals in a game
List of National Basketball Association annual minutes leaders

References

External links
 

1956 births
Living people
20th-century African-American sportspeople
21st-century African-American people
African-American basketball coaches
African-American basketball players
American men's basketball coaches
American men's basketball players
Atlanta Hawks players
Basketball coaches from Illinois
Basketball players from Chicago
Chicago Bulls assistant coaches
Continental Basketball Association coaches
Detroit Pistons head coaches
Naismith Memorial Basketball Hall of Fame inductees
National Basketball Association All-Stars
National Basketball Association players with retired numbers
New Jersey Nets players
New York Knicks players
Oklahoma City Thunder assistant coaches
Philadelphia 76ers assistant coaches
Philadelphia 76ers draft picks
Philadelphia 76ers players
Philadelphia 76ers head coaches
Point guards
Portland Trail Blazers head coaches
San Antonio Spurs players
West Texas A&M Buffaloes basketball players